The 1927 Chattanooga Moccasins football team represented the University of Chattanooga as a member of the Southern Intercollegiate Athletic Association (SIAA) the 1927 college football season. The team tied for the SIAA championship.

Schedule

References

Chattanooga
Chattanooga Mocs football seasons
Chattanooga Moccasins football